Chenoweth is a name of Cornish origin.

Chenoweth may also refer to:

 Chenoweth, Ohio
 Chenoweth, Oregon

See also
 Chenoweth Massacre, the last major Native American raid in present-day Jefferson County, Kentucky (Louisville Metro)
 Chenoweth Airpark, a private airport located 3 miles west of The Dalles in Wasco County, Oregon, USA